The 95th Infantry Division (95. Infanterie-Division) was a formation of the Imperial German Army in World War I.

History

The division was first formed on 1 July 1917 at the Eastern Front, where they fought until the finalisation of the Peace Treaty of Brest-Litovsk. Following the peace treaty and the end of World War I, they continued to function as an occupying force in Ukraine. The final units of the troop returned therefrom to their homes on 16 May 1919 and were subsequently demobilised and finally disbanded.

Timeline of combats

1917 
 1 July until 1 December --- static combat in the Pinsk Marshes
 2 until 17 December --- Ceasefire
 From 17 December --- Armistice

1918 
 Until 18 February --- Armistice
 18 February until 21 June --- Fighting in support of Ukraine
 30 March --- Combat at Krasnoye
 10 until 11 April --- Seizing of Belgorod
 14 April until 8 May --- Gang warfare north of the Seym River
 22 June until 15 November --- Occupation of Ukraine
 From 16 November --- Withdrawal from Ukraine

1919 
 Until 16 March --- Withdrawal from Ukraine

Order of battle

Order of battle at wartime 1917/18 
 10th Reserve-Infanterie-Brigade
 Landwehr-Infanterie-Regiment Nr. 52
 Infanterie-Regiment Nr. 423
 Landwehr-Infanterie-Regiment Nr. 430
 4th Eskadron/Oldenburgisches Dragoner-Regiment Nr. 19
 Reserve-Feldartillerie-Regiment Nr. 69
 Divisions-Nachrichten-Kommandeur Nr. 95

Commanders

References

 95. Infanterie-Division (Chronik 1915/1918) - Der erste Weltkrieg
 Franz Bettag, Die Eroberung von Nowo Georgiewsk. Schlachten des Weltkrieges, Bd. 8 (Oldenburg, 1926)
 Hermann Cron et al., Ruhmeshalle unserer alten Armee (Berlin, 1935)
 Hermann Cron, Geschichte des deutschen Heeres im Weltkriege 1914-1918 (Berlin, 1937)
 Erich von Falkenhayn, Der Feldzug der 9. Armee gegen die Rumänen und Russen, 1916/17 (Berlin, 1921)
 Oberstleutnant a. D. Dr. Curt Treitschke, Der Rückmarsch aus Rumänien. Mit der Mackensen-Armee vom Sereth durch Siebenbürgen nach Sachsen (Dresden 1938)
 Günter Wegner, Stellenbesetzung der deutschen Heere 1825-1939. (Biblio Verlag, Osnabrück, 1993), Bd. 1
 Histories of Two Hundred and Fifty-One Divisions of the German Army which Participated in the War (1914-1918), compiled from records of Intelligence section of the General Staff, American Expeditionary Forces, at General Headquarters, Chaumont, France 1919 (1920)

Infantry divisions of Germany in World War I